The molecular formula C17H16O5 (molar mass: 300.30 g/mol, exact mass: 300.099773 u) may refer to:
 Coelogin, a phenanthrenoid found in the orchid Coelogyne cristata
 Confusarin, a phrenathrenoid found in orchids
 Flavokavain C, a kavalactone
 Gymnopusin, a phenanthrenoid found in several orchids
 Methyllinderone
 Plicatol A, a phenanthrenoid found in the orchid Flickingeria fimbriata
 3,4,8-Trimethoxyphenanthrene-2,5-diol, a phenanthrenoid found in the orchid Dendrobium nobile